Emmanuel Arnold is a Sri Lankan Tamil politician, former provincial councillor and the former Mayor of Jaffna.

Career
Arnold contested the 2013 provincial council election as one of the Tamil National Alliance's candidates in Jaffna District and was elected to the Northern Provincial Council. After the election he was appointed to assist the Chief Minister on enterprise promotion and sports development. He took his oath as provincial councillor in front of Chief Minister C. V. Vigneswaran at Veerasingam Hall on 11 October 2013.

Arnold resigned from the Northern Provincial Council in December 2017 in order to contest the 2018 local elections as the TNA's mayoral candidate in Jaffna. He was elected to Jaffna Municipal Council as the member for Passaiyoor ward. He was subsequently elected Mayor when the council met for the first time in 26 March 2018.

Electoral history

References

Illankai Tamil Arasu Kachchi politicians
Living people
Mayors of Jaffna
Members of the Northern Provincial Council
People from Northern Province, Sri Lanka
Sri Lankan Tamil politicians
Tamil National Alliance politicians
Year of birth missing (living people)